This is a list of members of the fifth Gauteng Provincial Legislature as elected in the election of 7 May 2014. In that election, the African National Congress (ANC) retained a significantly diminished majority in the legislature, winning 40 of 73 seats. The Democratic Alliance (DA), with 23 seats, retained its status as the official opposition in the legislature. The Economic Freedom Fighters (EFF), a newly established party, became the third-largest party in the province with eight seats, while the Freedom Front Plus (FF+) and Inkatha Freedom Party (IFP) retained one seat apiece. Three other parties – the African Christian Democratic Party, the Congress of the People, and the Independent Democrats – lost their representation in the legislature.

The legislature was constituted on 21 May 2014 and, during its first sitting, it elected the ANC's David Makhura to his first term as Premier of Gauteng. The legislature also elected Ntombi Mekgwe as Speaker and re-elected Uhuru Moiloa as Deputy Speaker. Nomantu Ralehoko was elected as Chairperson of Committees, with Doreen Senokoanyane as her deputy. In later reshuffles of the presiding offices, Ralehoko became Deputy Speaker, Mike Madlala became Chairperson of Committees, and Mpapa Kanyane became Deputy Chairperson of Committees.

Composition 
This is a graphical comparison of party strengths as they were in the fifth Gauteng Provincial Legislature.

|-style="background:#e9e9e9;"
!colspan="2" style="text-align:left"| Party !! style="text-align:center"| Seats 
|-
|  || 40 
|-
|  || 23 
|-
|  || 8 
|-
|  || 1 
|-
|  || 1
|-
|colspan="2" style="text-align:left"| Total || style="text-align:right"| 73 
|}

Members 
This is a list of members of the fifth legislature as elected in May 2014 but accounting for changes in membership after the election. In addition to changes after the legislature was constituted, several individuals were elected to seats in May 2014 but declined to be sworn in to the legislature. These were Anton Alberts of the FF+ (replaced by Philip van Staden); Dali Mpofu and Omphile Maotwe of the EFF (replaced by Christinah Mabala and Hoffinel Ntobeng); and Eric Xayiya, Nomvula Mokonyane, and Mandla Nkomfe of the ANC (replaced by Thuliswa Nkabinde, Busisiwe Mncube and Mafika Mgcina).

References 

Legislature